Deirdre Nansen McCloskey (born Donald N. McCloskey; September 11, 1942 in Ann Arbor, Michigan) is the professor of economics, history, English, and communication at the University of Illinois at Chicago (UIC). She is also adjunct professor of philosophy and classics there, and for five years was a visiting professor of philosophy at Erasmus University, Rotterdam. Since October 2007 she has received six honorary doctorates. In 2013, she received the Julian L. Simon Memorial Award from the Competitive Enterprise Institute for her work examining factors in history that led to advancement in human achievement and prosperity.  Her main research interests include the origins of the modern world, the misuse of statistical significance in economics and other sciences, and the study of capitalism, among many others.

Career

McCloskey earned her undergraduate and graduate degrees in economics at Harvard University. Her dissertation, supervised by Alexander Gerschenkron, on British iron and steel won in 1973 the David A. Wells Prize.

In 1968, McCloskey became an assistant professor of economics at the University of Chicago, where she stayed for 12 years, gaining tenure as an associate professor in economics in 1975, and an associate professorship in history in 1979.  Her work at Chicago, under her birth name Donald McCloskey, is marked by her contribution to the cliometric revolution in economic history, and teaching generations of leading economists Chicago Price Theory, a course which culminated in her book The Applied Theory of Price.  In 1979, at the suggestion of Wayne Booth in English at Chicago, she turned to the study of rhetoric in economics.  Later at the University of Iowa, McCloskey, the John Murray Professor of Economics and of History (1980–1999), published The Rhetoric of Economics (1985) and co-founded with John S. Nelson, Allan Megill, and others an institution and graduate program, the Project on Rhetoric of Inquiry. McCloskey has authored 16 books and nearly 400 articles in her many fields.

Her major contributions have been to the economic history of Britain (19th-century trade, modern history, and medieval agriculture), the quantification of historical inquiry (Cliometrics), the rhetoric of economics, the rhetoric of the human sciences, economic methodology, virtue ethics, feminist economics, heterodox economics, the role of mathematics in economic analysis, and the use (and misuse) of significance testing in economics, her trilogy "The Bourgeois Era", and the origins of the Industrial Revolution.

McCloskey was elected to the American Academy of Arts and Sciences in 2021.

Bourgeois era
Her book The Bourgeois Virtues: Ethics for an Age of Commerce was the first of a planned series of books about the world since the Industrial Revolution—the Bourgeois Era—and was published in 2006. McCloskey argued that the bourgeoisie, contrary to its self-advertised faith in prudence only, believes in all seven virtues.

The second, Bourgeois Dignity: Why Economics Can't Explain the Modern World, was published in 2010, and argued that the unprecedented increase in human welfare of the 19th and 20th centuries, from $3 per capita per day to over $100 per day, issued not from capitalist accumulation but from innovation.

The third, Bourgeois Equality: How Ideas, Not Capital or Institutions, Enriched the World, appeared in 2016. McCloskey expanded her argument, coining the term "Great Enrichment" to describe the unprecedented gains in human welfare of the 19th and 20th centuries. She reiterated her argument that the enrichment came from innovation and not from accumulation as argued by many including Thomas Piketty.

She published Leave Me Alone and I’ll Make You Rich: How the Bourgeois Deal Enriched the World (co-authored with Art Carden) in 2022. The book attributes modern economic growth to liberalism and the bourgeois attaining freedom. In doing so, the book challenges other common explanations for modern economic growth, such as institutions, state capacity, scientific innovation and trade. In a review of the book, Joel Mokyr recognized that the ideology of liberalism was important in facilitating modern economic growth, but argued the book does not convincingly explain why liberalism won out in a marketplace of ideas.

In 2019, she published  Why Liberalism Works: How True Liberal Values Produce a Freer, More Equal, Prosperous World for All.

Personal life
McCloskey is the eldest child of Robert McCloskey, a professor of government at Harvard University, and Helen McCloskey, a poet. McCloskey was born Donald McCloskey and lived as a man until the age of 53. Married for thirty years, and the parent of two children, she made the decision to transition from male to female in 1995, writing about her experience in a New York Times Notable Book of the Year, Crossing: A Memoir (1999, University of Chicago Press). It is an account of her growing recognition of her female identity, and her transition—both surgical and social—into a woman (including her reluctant divorce from her wife). The book describes how in her teenage years, McCloskey would commit gender burglaries of neighbors' homes, dressing up in the crinoline dresses favored by young women of that era, in addition to "shoes, garter belts and all the equipment of a 1950s girl". The memoir then goes on to describe her new life, following sex-reassignment surgery, in her career as a female academic economist and scholar of femininity.

McCloskey has advocated on behalf of the rights of persons and organizations in the LGBT community. She was a vocal critic of J. Michael Bailey's 2003 book The Man Who Would Be Queen, which popularized the theory of autogynephilia as a motivation for sex reassignment, by the sexologist Ray Blanchard.

McCloskey has described herself as a "literary, quantitative, postmodern, free-market, progressive Episcopalian, Midwestern woman from Boston who was once a man. Not 'conservative'! I'm a Christian Classical Liberal."

In 2008, McCloskey was awarded an honorary doctorate by NUI Galway.

McCloskey ran as the Libertarian Party candidate in the 2022 Illinois Comptroller election against incumbent Democrat Susana Mendoza, coming in third with 1.9% of the vote.

Publications
 Why liberalism works: how true liberal values produce a freer, more equal, prosperous world for all (2019), Yale University Press. 
 Bourgeois Equality: How Ideas, Not Capital or Institutions, Enriched the World (2016), University of Chicago Press. 
 Bourgeois Dignity: Why Economics Can't Explain the Modern World (2010), University of Chicago Press. 
 The Cult of Statistical Significance: How the Standard Error Costs Us Jobs, Justice, and Lives (2008), University of Michigan Press (with Stephen T. Ziliak). 
 The Bourgeois Virtues : Ethics for an Age of Commerce (2006), University of Chicago Press.  
 The Economic Conversation (2008) (with Arjo Klamer and Stephen Ziliak) 
 The Secret Sins of Economics (2002), University of Chicago Press. 
 Crossing: A Memoir (S1999). New edition University of Chicago Press, 2000, 
 Measurement and Meaning in Economics: The Essential Deirdre McCloskey (1999) (edited by Stephen Ziliak) 
 The Vices of Economists, the Virtues of the Bourgeoisie (1996) 
 Knowledge and Persuasion in Economics (1994), Cambridge University Press. 
 Second Thoughts: Myths and Morals of U.S. Economic History (1993) (edited) 
 A Bibliography of Historical Economics to 1980 (1990) 
 If You're So Smart: The Narrative of Economic Expertise (1990) 
 The Consequences of Economic Rhetoric (1988) 
 The Writing of Economics (1987) reprinted as Economical Writing (2000) 
 Econometric History (1987) 
 The Rhetoric of the Human Sciences: Language and Argument in Scholarship and Public Affairs (1987) 
 The Rhetoric of Economics (1985 & 1998) 
 The Applied Theory of Price (1982 & 1985) 
 Enterprise and Trade in Victorian Britain: Essays in Historical Economics (1981) 
 Economic Maturity and Entrepreneurial Decline: British Iron & Steel, 1870–1913 (1973) 
 Essays on a Mature Economy: Britain after 1840 (1971)

Articles

 
 
 
 
  Pdf.
 
 
  Pdf.

See also
 Feminist economics
 List of feminist economists

References

External links
 Deirdre McCloskey personal home page
 "Leading Economist Stuns Field by Deciding to Become a Woman"
 In Defense of Extreme Rationalism: Thoughts on Donald McCloskey's The Rhetoric of Economics by Hans-Hermann Hoppe.
  Home page International Association for Feminist Economics (IAFFE)
 Home page Feminist Economics journal
 IDEAS repository of papers
 Association for Integrity and Responsible Leadership in Economics and Associated Professions
 
 

1942 births
Living people
21st-century American economists
American Episcopalians
American feminist writers
American libertarians
American non-fiction writers
American philosophy academics
American political writers
American rhetoricians
American women economists
American women non-fiction writers
Christian libertarians
Classics educators
Economists from Michigan
Academic staff of Erasmus University Rotterdam
Feminist economists
Harvard University alumni
Individualist feminists
LGBT Anglicans
Transgender memoirists
LGBT people from Michigan
Transgender scientists
American LGBT scientists
Libertarian economists
People from Ann Arbor, Michigan
Transfeminists
Transgender women
University of Illinois Chicago faculty
University of Iowa faculty
Writers from Michigan
20th-century American women writers
21st-century American women writers
Academics of the London School of Economics
Presidents of the Economic History Association
Member of the Mont Pelerin Society
American transgender writers